Orihuela Club de Fútbol is a Spanish football team based in Orihuela, in the Valencian Community. Founded in 1993 it plays in Tercera División RFEF – Group 3, holding home games at Estadio Municipal Los Arcos, with a capacity of 7,000 seats.

History
On 4 August 1993, the chairman of Orihuela Juventud y Deportes, Pedro Albarracín, received a notification from the Valencian Community Football Federation, allowing him to change the name of the club to Orihuela Club de Fútbol. A few months before, when the youth team of Atlético Orihuela was promoted to Liga Nacional Juvenil de Fútbol, the presidents of both clubs, Albarracín and Francisco Polín González, agreed on a merge, which created Orihuela Club de Fútbol.

The first club home kit was orange shirts and white shorts, as former Orihuela Juventud y Deportes, because the historical Orihuela Deportiva CF (founded in 1944) was still competing. Once the latter disappeared in 1994, Orihuela CF adopted their colours (yellow and blue) and became the most important local team.

From 1993 to 1996 the club played in Primera Regional, obtaining promotion to Regional Preferente at the end of the third season. At the end of the 1996–97 campaign, new chairman Ángel Fenoll "acquired" the place of Club Deportivo Los Garres in Tercera División, and Orihuela began their new era in Spanish national football.

It was with Paco Gómez as club owner that the side reached Segunda División B for the first time in its history in 2002–03, after being defeated several times in the play-offs. However, a very bad season ended with the team back in the fourth level.

In the 2003–04 season things didn't change for the better, as Gómez became owner of FC Cartagena and focused his efforts on his new club, although he was still Orihuela's chairman. A year later, José Rodríguez acquired the team and, after two seasons in charge, it was promoted again to division three; however, under Rodríguez's management, Orihuela soon underwent financial problems because of its excessive expenses and, at the beginning of 2008–09, Antonio Pedrera, one of the co-owners, took charge and became the new chairman.

Orihuela managed to stay up in the third division after a great comeback during the second half of the season. Luis Tevenet, who had begun the campaign as a player, became the new manager at the end of 2008, but his good work did not assure his job since new owners took control of the team for 2009–10, bringing with them a new manager and new players. It helped the club finish 7th in the Segunda División B. The key role in that team was played by Fleki. 

Fernando Presa was the head of the new board, but when he and the rest of his associates had to pay Orihuela's debt in order to avoid relegation to the fourth level, they left the club. With little time to spare, the former board took charge again and paid the debt in the last hour of the deadline – the team was eventually allowed to stay in the third tier and Francisco Rodríguez was named the new president.

These matters had very negative consequences for the team, as the new board had to cancel some of the high contracts that Presa had offered to some of the new players and bring new faces when the team was already immerse in pre-season. In spite of these setbacks, Orihuela had an excellent first half of the season that all but almost guaranteed its presence in the third division for another year, and the board took advantage of this situation to release some of the best players such as Adrián Ripa, José Manuel Meca or Alejandro Colorado in order to reduce the wage budget – finally the team finished in seventh position, with Nacho Cobaleda becoming the first-ever elected president of the club during the campaign (he was replaced by Antonio Felices months later). In the 2018-19 season the club won Tercera División, Group 6 and was promoted to Segunda División B.

Club background
Orihuela Deportiva CF – (1944–95)
Orihuela Club de Fútbol – (1993–)

Season to season

10 seasons in Segunda División B
14 seasons in Tercera División
1 season in Tercera División RFEF

Current squad

References

External links
Official website 
BDFutbol profile

 
Football clubs in the Valencian Community
Association football clubs established in 1993
1993 establishments in Spain